Stranvaesia nussia is a small Evergreen tree species  of genus Stranvaesia in the family Rosaceae.

Location 
S. nussia are restricted to particular altitudinal ranges, along with being a rare tree species found in the Binsar Wildlife Sanctuary. These trees can also be found distributed throughout the Himalayas, South China, Indonesia, and the Philippines.

Description 

 Height: 5-9m tall.
 Branches: pilose when young, purple/brown when old.
 Petiole: 1 cm.

References

nussia